Artabanus of Persia (or Artabanus the Hyrcanian) was a Persian political figure during the Achaemenid dynasty who was reportedly Regent of Persia for a few months (465 BC – 464 BC).

This Artabanus is not to be confused with Xerxes' uncle of the same name: Artabanus, son of Hystaspes (and thus the brother of Xerxes' father Darius I).

Artabanus probably originated from the province of Hyrcania and reportedly served as the chief official of Xerxes I. He is considered to have served either as his vizier or as his head bodyguard.

According to Aristotle, Artabanus was responsible for the death of Crown Prince Darius. He then became afraid that Xerxes would seek revenge and proceeded to assassinate the King. On the other hand, Junianus Justinus reported that Artabanus had personal ambitions for the throne. He first secretly murdered Xerxes and then accused Darius of parricide, resulting in his execution. The order of events remains uncertain but the deaths of Xerxes and Darius did leave the throne vacant.

Artabanus' course of action is also uncertain. Some accounts have him usurping the throne for himself. Others consider him to have named young Artaxerxes I as King and to have acted as Regent and power behind the throne. This state of affairs would not last more than a few months. Artaxerxes reportedly slew him with his own sword, either in battle or by surprise. Artabanus is occasionally listed among the Kings of the Achaemenid dynasty though he was not related to them.

In popular culture
Artabanus appears as a character in Leonardo Vinci's 1730 opera Artaserse.

A character based on the historical Artabanus appears in the Assassin's Creed video game series under the alias "Darius". He is first mentioned in Assassin's Creed II (2009) as the person thought to be the originator of the Assassins' signature weapon, the Hidden Blade, which he used to assassinate Xerxes in 465 BC. For this, he is remembered as a legendary figure in the history of the Assassins, and a statue of him was placed in the sanctuary underneath the Villa Auditore in Monteriggioni, Italy, as well as a tomb dedicted to him being built beneath the Santa Maria Novella church in Florence. Darius makes his first in-person appearance in Legacy of the First Blade, a DLC expansion for Assassin's Creed Odyssey (2018), in which it is revealed that he is not an Assassin, but rather a freedom fighter whose ideals and organization would eventually give rise to those of the Hidden Ones and, in turn, the Assassin Brotherhood. In Legacy of the First Blade, Darius is initially presented as an antagonist with indeterminate motivations, before later becoming an ally who fights alongside the player character against the Order of the Ancients, the precursors to the Knights Templars, the Assassins' mortal enemies. Darius' backstory is given in the expansion, revealing that he killed Xerxes, who was being controlled by the Order, to end his tyrannical rule over the Persian people. However, when he planned the assassination of Xerxes' successor, Artaxerxes I, to prevent him from also falling victim to the Order's manipulation, he was stopped by his brother-in-arms (and future Order leader) Amorges, who believed it was unnecessary to kill the new king. Darius was subsequently forced to flee Persia with his last surviving child after he was branded a traitor and the Order killed the rest of his family.

Classical sources
Aristotle, Politics 5.131Ib
Diodorus Siculus, Historical Library 11.69  
Justin, Epitome of Philipic Histories of Pompeius Trogus III 1  
Photius, Epitome of Persica of Ctesias 20 
Plutarch, Life of Themistocles 27

See also 
 Artapanus (general)

464 BC deaths
5th-century BC Pharaohs
Ancient murderers
Regents
Rulers in the Achaemenid Empire
Regicides
Year of birth unknown
5th-century BC Iranian people